The AACTA Award for Best Actress in a Leading Role is an award presented by the Australian Academy of Cinema and Television Arts (AACTA), a non-profit organisation whose aim is to "identify, award, promote, and celebrate Australia's greatest achievements in film and television".

The award is presented annually at the AACTA Awards, which hands out accolades for achievements in feature films, television, documentaries, and short films. From 1971 to 2010, the category was presented by the Australian Film Institute (AFI), the Academy's parent organisation, at the annual Australian Film Institute Awards (known as the AFI Awards). When the AFI launched the AACTA in 2011, it changed the annual ceremony to the AACTA Awards, with the current award being a continuum of the AFI Award for Best Actress in a Leading Role.

From 1971 to 1975, it was presented as a special award, and was accompanied with a cash prize, before it became a competitive award from 1976 onward. Judy Davis is the most nominated and winning actress in this category, with nine nominations, including six wins, most recently for her role in Nitram (2021).

Candidates for this award must be female, and cannot be nominated for the same role in the supporting actress category.

Winners and nominees
In the following table, the years listed correspond to the year of film release; the ceremonies are usually held the same year. The actress in bold and in dark blue background have received a special award; those in bold and in yellow background have won a regular competitive award. Those that are neither highlighted nor in bold are the nominees. When sorted chronologically, the table always lists the winning actress first and then the other nominees.

AFI Awards

1970s

1980s

1990s

2000s

2010s

AACTA Awards

2010s

2020s

Notes

A: From 1958–2010, the awards were held during the year of the film's release. However, the 1974–1975 awards were held in 1975 for films released in 1974 and 1975, and the first AACTA Awards were held in 2012 for films released in 2011.

References

External links
 Official website of the Australian Academy of Cinema and Television Arts

A
AACTA Award winners
Film awards for lead actress